Sibirocyba is a monotypic genus of Asian sheet weavers containing the single species, Sibirocyba incerta. It was first described by K. Y. Eskov & Y. M. Marusik in 1994, and has only been found in Russia and Siberia.

See also
 List of Linyphiidae species (Q–Z)

References

Linyphiidae
Monotypic Araneomorphae genera
Spiders of Russia